Ilovatka is a rural locality (a selo) and the administrative center of Ilovatskoye Rural Settlement, Staropoltavsky District, Volgograd Oblast, Russia. The population was 1,434 as of 2010. There are 22 streets.

Geography 
Ilovatka is located in steppe, on the east bank of the Volgograd Reservoir, 55 km west of Staraya Poltavka (the district's administrative centre) by road. Belokamenka is the nearest rural locality.

References 

Rural localities in Staropoltavsky District